Fort Portal Regional Referral Hospital, commonly known as Fort Portal Hospital, sometimes referred to as Buhinga Hospital, is a hospital in the town of Fort Portal, in Fort Portal District, Western Uganda. It is the referral hospital for the districts of Bundibugyo, Kabarole, Kamwenge, Kasese, Ntoroko and Kyenjojo.

Location
The coordinates of the hospital are:0°39'19.0"N, 30°16'53.0"E (Latitude:0.655278; Longitude:30.281389).

Overview
Fort Portal Hospital is a public hospital, funded by the Uganda Ministry of Health and general care in the hospital is free. It is one of the 13 "Regional Referral Hospitals" in Uganda. The hospital is designated as one of the 15 "Internship Hospitals" where graduates of Ugandan medical schools can serve one year of internship under the supervision of qualified specialists and consultants. The bed capacity of Fort Portal Hospital is quoted as 333.

See also
Hospitals in Uganda

References

External links
  Kabarole District Internet Portal
 Hospitals Are Death Traps, Report Says

Hospitals in Uganda
Fort Portal
Kabarole District
Toro sub-region